The Meuse citadels or Mosane citadels are a group of forts situated along the Meuse river in southern Belgian region of Wallonia. The citadels were originally intended to defend the Prince-Bishopric of Liège and County of Namur and were later modernized during the periods of French and Dutch rule. They include four citadels, at Namur, Liège, Huy and Dinant, all of which are partially or totally preserved.

List of citadels

UNESCO proposal
On 8 April 2008, the citadels of Dinant, Namur and Huy were officially proposed as candidates to be UNESCO World Heritage Sites under the reference number 5365. After discussions, it was decided to propose Namur alone, possibly in combination with Dinant.

See also

Fort de Charlemont, Givet

References

External links

UNESCO tentative list, proposal 5365
Citadel of Namur (official website) 
Citadel of Dinant (official website)
Citadel of Huy (official website)

 
Fortifications in Belgium
Buildings and structures in Liège Province
Buildings and structures in Namur (province)